The Ezulwini Mosque is a mosque in Lobamba, Hhohho Region, Eswatini.

History
The mosque was constructed in 1978.

Architecture
The mosque has a capacity for 370 worshipers.

See also
 Islam in Eswatini

References

Hhohho Region
Islam in Eswatini
Mosques in Africa
Religious buildings and structures in Eswatini